Wait for It could refer to:

Entertainment
"Wait for It" (How I Met Your Mother), an episode of the CBS sitcom How I Met Your Mother
"Wait for It", a catchphrase of Barney Stinson, a character in the show
"Wait for It" (song), a song from the musical Hamilton
"Wait for It... Wait for It", a 2010 song by punk rock band Dead to Me